Cautano is a comune (municipality) constituted from two countries, Cautano and Cacciano, in the Province of Benevento (until 1861 Province of Avellino) in the Italian region Campania, located about 75 km (46.6 mi) northeast of Naples and about 13 km (8 mi) west of Benevento and about 13 km (8 mi) north of Montesarchio. .

Cautano borders the following municipalities: Campoli del Monte Taburno, Foglianise, Frasso Telesino, Tocco Caudio, Vitulano.

References

External links
 Official website

Cities and towns in Campania